Earl W. McCune Jr. (May 30, 1956, San Francisco – May 27, 2020, Santa Clara, California) was an American electrical engineer, telecommunications engineer, inventor, Silicon Valley entrepreneur, and IEEE Fellow. He is known for his research on achieving "Green" communications systems that have optimal energy efficiency.

Biography
McCune graduated in 1979 with a B.S. in electrical engineering and computer science from UC Berkeley, in 1983 with an M.S. in radioscience from Stanford University, and in 1998 with a Ph.D. in electrical and computer engineering from UC Davis. His Ph.D. thesis Extended phase-shift keying was supervised by William A. Gardner. In August 1979 in Santa Clara, California, McCune married Barbara A. Percell.

Earl McCune had over 40 years of experience in the wireless communications industry. He held more than 90 patents.

In 1993 in Silicon Valley, he opened an independent consulting office with an extensive research library. He also invested in a sophisticated metrology laboratory with both analog and digital instruments. There the measurements he performed included: "high dynamic phase noise, clock jitter, modulation accuracy and distortion, full semiconductor curve tracing, and vector network analysis."

McCune with colleagues co-founded three successful start-ups. The first was Digital RF Solutions (DRFS), which was founded in 1986 and merged in 1991 with Proxim. The second was Tropian in 1996 and acquired by Panasonic in 2006. After the 2006 acquisition, he became a Technology Fellow at Panasonic and continued to work as an author, instructor, and independent consultant. In 2013 in Mountain View, California, with two other engineers with PhDs, McCune, as CTO, co-founded Eridan Communications, Inc. When he died he was both Eridan's CTO and a part-time professor at Delft University of Technology (TU Delft).

In 2018 he became a fellow of the IEEE Circuits and Systems Society. Upon his death he was survived by his widow.

Selected publications

Articles

Books

References

External link
 

1956 births
2020 deaths
University of California, Berkeley alumni
Stanford University School of Engineering alumni
University of California, Davis alumni
American electrical engineers
American telecommunications engineers
20th-century American inventors
21st-century American inventors
American technology company founders
Silicon Valley people
Fellow Members of the IEEE
People from San Francisco